Mahibere Degue, also transliterated as Mahbere Dego is a historical town in Tigray regional state, Ethiopia. It is located 12.5 km south of the city of Axum. The town is known for its church, Enda Tsadkan ("Home of the Saints"), which is a popular tourist attraction.

Residents of the town engage in trade and agricultural activities in the surrounding villages. Siwa, a tasty local drink, is a favourite, and is a popular commodity.

The Mahbere Dego massacre
The Ethiopian National Defense Force (ENDF) killed dozens of civilians in Mahbere Dego in January 2021. The massacres occurred in a similar way as so many massacres in the Tigray War. The ENDF targeted civilians, especially male, in this case merchants, farmers, often brothers or father and son. They filmed the killings, and, exceptionally, a whistleblower transmitted the videos to Tigrai Media House.
Dozens of unarmed civilian men were grouped in the wilderness outside of the town, driven to a cliff edge and executed by the Ethiopian soldiers. Thanks to the particular geomorphology of the surroundings, the imagery could be geolocated.
After factchecking the footage of the massacres was published by CNN and BBC.
On 27 June CNN published more video material they received from Tigrai Media House, identifying one of the filming soldiers as "Fafi" and naming his brigade and division. In the extended video Fafi himself is seen taking part in the executions.

References

Populated places in the Tigray Region
Aksumite Empire
Tigray Region